This is the discography of British doo-wop revival band Darts.

Albums

Studio albums

Live albums

Compilation albums

Box sets

Singles

References

Discographies of British artists
Pop music group discographies
Rock music group discographies